Lampronia splendidella is a moth of the family Prodoxidae. It is found in Germany, Poland, Slovakia, Austria and Switzerland. In the east, the range extends to the Altai Mountains.

The wingspan is 12–15 mm. The forewings are uniformly medium brown with a bronzy lustre. The hindwings are darker grey. Adults are on wing in May and June.

References

External links

Lepiforum.de

Moths described in 1870
Prodoxidae
Moths of Europe
Moths of Asia
Taxa named by Hermann von Heinemann